The Oxford Group or Oxford Vegetarians consisted of a group of intellectuals in England in the late 1960s and early 1970s associated with the University of Oxford, who met and corresponded to discuss the emerging concept of animal rights, or animal liberation.

The Oxford Group initially consisted of postgraduate philosophy students, and included Stanley and Roslind Godlovitch, John Harris, David Wood, and Michael Peters (a sociology postgrad). Its members were active in academic circles in Oxford, and through their influence others became interested in the idea of developing a moral philosophy that included non-humans. A particular inspiration was the writing of Brigid Brophy, the novelist. The idea of editing a collection of essays on animal rights emerged, and Brophy and others agreed to contribute. The first publisher approached (at Ms Brophy's suggestion) was Michael Joseph where an editor suggested that such a book would be more interesting if group members contributed, as well as better known authors. However, they were not interested, so Godlovitch and Harris then approached Victor Goillancz, where they met Giles Gordon. Gollancz were keen to go ahead, and the book was published a few months later as Animals, Men and Morals in 1971.

The period was a fertile one for the development of the concept of animal rights, both at the academic and activist level. Members of the Oxford Group contributed to a series of scholarly works that examined the moral assumptions underpinning the use of non-human animals, and helped to formulate a counter-position. The group engaged in political activism too, writing and handing out leaflets protesting against animal testing and hunting. Two of its members, Richard D. Ryder and Andrew Linzey, organized the Cambridge Conference on Animal Rights at Trinity College, Cambridge in 1977, the first international conference devoted explicitly to animal rights.

Cambridge Conference on Animal Rights
The conference proceedings were published as Animals' Rights: A Symposium (1979). It produced a declaration – an appeal for animal rights and an end to speciesism – signed by 150 attendees:

People associated with the group
Roslind and Stanley Godlovitch, husband and wife from Montreal, at the time postgraduate students in philosophy at St Hilda's College and New College, Oxford respectively, co-editors of an influential collection of essays, Animals, Men and Morals (1971)
John Harris, postgraduate student in philosophy at Balliol College, co-editor of Animals, Men and Morals.
Ruth Harrison, author of Animal Machines (1964), a criticism of factory farming
Andrew Linzey, the Oxford theologian, author of Animal Rights: A Christian Assessment (1976), and founder in 2006 of the Oxford Centre for Animal Ethics
Brigid Brophy, the novelist, author of an essay, "The Rights of Animals" (1965), which was published in The Sunday Times
Stephen R. L. Clark, philosopher, studied at Balliol College, Oxford (1964–1968), fellow of All Souls (1968–1975), author of The Moral Status of Animals (1976)
Patrick Corbett, philosopher, at the time a fellow at Balliol College
Colin McGinn, philosopher, postgraduate student at Jesus College, Oxford (1972–1974)
Mary Midgley, philosopher, author of Beast and Man (1978) and Animals And Why They Matter: A Journey Around the Species Barrier (1983)
Michael Peters, sociologist, formerly of Hertford College, Oxford
Tom Regan, the American philosopher and author of The Case for Animal Rights (1983), came into contact with the group when he visited Oxford in 1973.
Richard Ryder, former animal researcher and senior clinical psychologist at the Warneford Hospital, Oxford, author of a 1970 leaflet on speciesism that coined the term, and later of Victims of Science: The Use of Animals in Research (1975) and Animal Revolution: Changing Attitudes Towards Speciesism (1989); former chairman of the RSPCA.
Peter Singer, the Australian philosopher, was a postgraduate student at University College, Oxford (1969–1973); he was not himself a member of the Oxford Group at the time, but came to know them. He is the author of Animal Liberation (1975)
David Wood, philosopher, postgraduate student at New College, Oxford (1968–1971)
Jon Wynne-Tyson, publisher, author of Food For a Future: The Complete Case For Vegetarianism (1979)

See also
List of animal rights advocates

Notes

Further reading
Finsen, Susan and Finsen, Lawrence. "Animal rights movement," in Marc Bekoff (ed.). The Encyclopedia of Animal Rights and Animal Welfare. Greenwood, 2009.
Free, Ann Cottrell. "A Tribute to Ruth Harrison", Animal Welfare Institute Quarterly, Fall 2000, Volume 49, Number 4.
Kean, Hilda. Animal Rights: Political and Social Change in Britain since 1800. Reaktion Books, 1998.
Paterson, David and Ryder, Richard D. Animals' Rights: A Symposium. Open Gate Press, 1979.
Ryder, Richard D. Animal Revolution. Basil Blackwell, 1989.
Garner, R., and Okuleye, Y. The Oxford Group and the Emergence of Animal Rights. Oxford, UK: Oxford University Press, December 2020. (For a full history of the group)

Oxford Group (animal rights)